Elizabeth "Betsy" Ashburn Duke (born July 23, 1952) is an American bank executive who served as a member of the Federal Reserve Board of Governors from 2008 to 2013. Duke was confirmed by the Senate to fill an unexpired term ending January 31, 2012. She was the seventh woman to be appointed to the board. In July 2013 she announced her resignation from the board.

On 1 January 2018, she became the Chair of the Board of Directors of Wells Fargo, having served as Vice-Chair from 12 October 2016.

Early life and education
Elizabeth Duke was born in Portsmouth, Virginia, and grew up in Virginia Beach, Virginia. She first studied physics at North Carolina State University before transferring to the University of North Carolina at Chapel Hill, where she graduated with a bachelor of fine arts in drama in 1974. She later graduated with an M.B.A. from Old Dominion University. After graduating, she worked as a part-time teller at First and Merchants National Bank in Virginia Beach because she "needed a job."

Professional career
In 1977, Duke became the vice president and chief financial officer of the Bank of Virginia Beach. While working full-time, she attended Old Dominion University part-time and received her MBA in 1983. She transferred to the Bank of Tidewater in 1985 as vice president and chief financial officer. She became its president in 1987 and chief executive officer in 1991. She was selected as a director of the Federal Reserve Bank of Richmond in 1998 and, in 1999, she was elected president of the Virginia Bankers Association.
Duke remained as president and CEO of Bank of Tidewater until it was acquired by SouthTrust in 2001. SouthTrust made her executive vice president of community bank development. When Wachovia acquired SouthTrust in 2004, Duke remained an executive VP, but in charge of the merger project office. She was also elected chairman of the American Bankers Association for the 2004-05 year. In 2005, she became senior executive vice president and chief operating officer of TowneBank. She was nominated to the Board of Governors of the Federal Reserve by President George W. Bush on May 15, 2007.

On July 11, 2013, Duke announced her resignation from the Fed board as of August 31, 2013.

Duke was elected Vice Chair of Wells Fargo's Board of Directors in October 2016. On August 15, 2017, Duke was elected to succeed Wells Fargo current chairman, Stephen Sanger, on Jan. 1, 2018, making the former Federal Reserve governor the first woman to hold the top board role at one of the nation's largest banks.

On March 9, 2020, Duke announced her resignation from the Wells Fargo Board.

Honors, activities
Member of the executive advisory council, Old Dominion University Business School.
Member of Virginia Council on Economic Education 2005-2006 Board of Directors
Commended as an exceptional role model for women in the banking industry by the Virginia General Assembly in 2005.
Honored as one of eight women in the Library of Virginia's 2014 "Virginia Women in History"

References

External links
Statement  before the Senate Committee on Banking, Housing, and Urban Affairs, August 2, 2007
Nomination by George W. Bush, May 15, 2007
Who Is Elizabeth Duke? Real Time Economics blog at The Wall Street Journal. June 29, 2008.
Statements and Speeches of Elizabeth Ashburn Duke

1952 births
Federal Reserve System governors
Living people
Old Dominion University alumni
People from Portsmouth, Virginia
North Carolina State University alumni
University of North Carolina at Chapel Hill alumni
George W. Bush administration personnel
Obama administration personnel
Wells Fargo employees